Henry  Ellenbogen (April 3, 1900July 4, 1985) was an American lawyer and politician who served as a Democratic member of the U.S. House of Representatives from Pennsylvania, serving from 1933 to 1938.

Biography
Ellenbogen was the son of Samson and Rose (née Franzos) Ellenbogen. He was born into a Jewish family in Vienna, then in Austria-Hungary, and attended the University of Vienna Law School. He immigrated to the United States and settled in Pittsburgh, Pennsylvania. He attended Duquesne University in Pittsburgh, and received his A.B. in 1921 and J.D. in 1924. He was appointed as arbitrator and public panel chairman by the National War Labor Board and the Third Regional War Labor Board in cases involving labor disputes. He wrote numerous articles on economic, social, and legal problems.

He married Rachel "Rae" Savage, and they had two daughters, author Naomi Feigelson Chase and Judith Specter. Mrs. Ellenbogen died in 1981.

Political career
Ellenbogen was first elected as a Democrat to the Seventy-third Congress. It was unclear at the time whether he was eligible to be a Representative, having only been a citizen of the United States for six years instead of the seven required by the Constitution of the United States. However, he was seated and voted as early as March 1933. He was re-elected to the Seventy-fourth, and Seventy-fifth Congresses and served until his resignation in 1938, having been elected judge of the common pleas court of Allegheny County, Pennsylvania. He was reelected as a judge in November 1947 and again in 1957 and served as presiding judge, 1963 to 1966.

Retirement and death
He retired and was a resident of Miami, Florida, until his death there. He is buried in West View Cemetery of the Rodef Shalom Congregation in Squirrel Hill, Pittsburgh.

See also 
 List of Jewish members of the United States Congress

References and sources 

 
 The Political Graveyard

External links 
 Story of his wife's 1932 campaign on his behalf

1900 births
1985 deaths
Jewish members of the United States House of Representatives
Austrian Jews
Democratic Party members of the United States House of Representatives from Pennsylvania
Austrian emigrants to the United States
Duquesne University alumni
University of Vienna alumni
20th-century American politicians
20th-century American Jews